The Mandlakazi are a Zulu clan in kwaZulu/Natal and formerly in Zululand.  They started out as allies of Shaka as he founded the Zulu nation.  The Mandlakazi derived wealth not only from cattle but from an extensive trade network that extended from northern Zululand north and east to Delagoa Bay in Mozambique.

The leader of the Mandlakazi was an inkosi (chief), and the position generally passed from father to son. Ndaba was the first known Mandlakazi inkosi and he was followed by his son Jama, who was Shaka's grandfather.  Jama's son Senzangakhona fathered Shaka, and his son Sojiyisa was the inkosi of the Mandlakazi who befriended his young nephew Shaka. His son, Maphitha was the inkosi of the Mandlakazi until 1872, although as early at 1856 and the Second Zulu Civil War his son Zibhenhu played a significant leadership role. In 1872 Zibhebhu kaMaphitha succeeded to inKosi of the Mandlakazi  people.

Notes and references

Zulu topics
Zulu history
History of KwaZulu-Natal